John Bray is a New Zealand former rugby league footballer who represented New Zealand.

Playing career
Bray played for the Hornby Panthers and the Christchurch club in the Canterbury Rugby League competition. He later represented Canterbury and the South Island.

Bray also played for the New Zealand national rugby league team, playing in two tests against France in 1964.

Later years
After retiring, Bray had a lengthy career in rugby league administration. He was elected to the New Zealand Rugby League in March 2008 and later made a life member of the NZRL in April 2011.

References

Living people
New Zealand rugby league players
New Zealand national rugby league team players
Canterbury rugby league team players
Hornby Panthers players
South Island rugby league team players
Rugby league five-eighths
New Zealand Rugby League board members
New Zealand rugby league administrators
Place of birth missing (living people)
Year of birth missing (living people)